This is a list of the mammal species recorded in Lesotho. There are sixty mammal species in Lesotho, of which one is endangered, two are vulnerable, and one is near threatened.

The following tags are used to highlight each species' conservation status as assessed by the International Union for Conservation of Nature:

Some species were assessed using an earlier set of criteria. Species assessed using this system have the following instead of near threatened and least concern categories:

Order: Afrosoricida (tenrecs and golden moles) 
The order Afrosoricida contains the golden moles of southern Africa and the tenrecs of Madagascar and Africa, two families of small mammals that were traditionally part of the order Insectivora.

Family: Chrysochloridae
Subfamily: Chrysochlorinae
Genus: Chlorotalpa
 Sclater's golden mole, Chlorotalpa sclateri LC
Subfamily: Amblysominae
Genus: Amblysomus
 Hottentot golden mole, Amblysomus hottentotus LC

Order: Hyracoidea (hyraxes) 

The hyraxes are any of four species of fairly small, thickset, herbivorous mammals in the order Hyracoidea. About the size of a domestic cat they are well-furred, with rounded bodies and a stumpy tail. They are native to Africa and the Middle East.

Family: Procaviidae (hyraxes)
Genus: Procavia
 Cape hyrax, Procavia capensis LC

Order: Primates 

The order Primates contains humans and their closest relatives: lemurs, lorisoids, tarsiers, monkeys, and apes.

Suborder: Haplorhini
Infraorder: Simiiformes
Parvorder: Catarrhini
Superfamily: Cercopithecoidea
Family: Cercopithecidae (Old World monkeys)
Genus: Papio
 Chacma baboon, P. ursinus

Order: Rodentia (rodents) 

Rodents make up the largest order of mammals, with over 40% of mammalian species. They have two incisors in the upper and lower jaw which grow continually and must be kept short by gnawing.

Suborder: Hystricognathi
Family: Bathyergidae
Genus: Cryptomys
 Common mole-rat, Cryptomys hottentotus LC
Family: Hystricidae (Old World porcupines)
Genus: Hystrix
 Cape porcupine, Hystrix africaeaustralis LC
Suborder: Sciurognathi
Family: Sciuridae (squirrels)
Subfamily: Xerinae
Tribe: Xerini
Genus: Xerus
 South African ground squirrel, Xerus inauris LC
Family: Gliridae (dormice)
Subfamily: Graphiurinae
Genus: Graphiurus
 Small-eared dormouse, Graphiurus microtis LC
Family: Nesomyidae
Subfamily: Dendromurinae
Genus: Dendromus
 Chestnut climbing mouse, Dendromus mystacalis LC
Genus: Steatomys
 Kreb's fat mouse, Steatomys krebsii LC
Subfamily: Mystromyinae
Genus: Mystromys
 White-tailed rat, Mystromys albicaudatus EN
Family: Muridae (mice, rats, voles, gerbils, hamsters, etc.)
Subfamily: Otomyinae
Genus: Otomys
 Vlei rat, Otomys irroratus LC
 Sloggett's vlei rat, Otomys sloggetti LC
Subfamily: Gerbillinae
Genus: Tatera
 Highveld gerbil, Tatera brantsii LC
Subfamily: Murinae
Genus: Aethomys
 Namaqua rock rat, Aethomys namaquensis LC
Genus: Mastomys
 Southern multimammate mouse, Mastomys coucha LC
 Natal multimammate mouse, Mastomys natalensis LC
Genus: Mus
 Orange mouse, Mus orangiae LC
Genus: Rhabdomys
 Four-striped grass mouse, Rhabdomys pumilio LC

Order: Lagomorpha (lagomorphs) 
The lagomorphs comprise two families, Leporidae (hares and rabbits), and Ochotonidae (pikas). Though they can resemble rodents, and were classified as a superfamily in that order until the early 20th century, they have since been considered a separate order. They differ from rodents in a number of physical characteristics, such as having four incisors in the upper jaw rather than two.

Family: Leporidae (rabbits, hares)
Genus: Lepus
 Cape hare, Lepus capensis LR/lc

Order: Erinaceomorpha (hedgehogs and gymnures) 
The order Erinaceomorpha contains a single family, Erinaceidae, which comprise the hedgehogs and gymnures. The hedgehogs are easily recognised by their spines while gymnures look more like large rats.

Family: Erinaceidae (hedgehogs)
Subfamily: Erinaceinae
Genus: Atelerix
 Southern African hedgehog, Atelerix frontalis LR/lc

Order: Soricomorpha (shrews, moles, and solenodons) 
The "shrew-forms" are insectivorous mammals. The shrews and solenodons closely resemble mice while the moles are stout-bodied burrowers.

Family: Soricidae (shrews)
Subfamily: Crocidurinae
Genus: Crocidura
 Reddish-gray musk shrew, Crocidura cyanea LC
 Greater red musk shrew, Crocidura flavescens LC
 Tiny musk shrew, Crocidura fuscomurina LC
Genus: Suncus
 Lesser dwarf shrew, Suncus varilla LC
Subfamily: Myosoricinae
Genus: Myosorex
 Forest shrew, Myosorex varius LC

Order: Chiroptera (bats) 

The bats' most distinguishing feature is that their forelimbs are developed as wings, making them the only mammals capable of flight. Bat species account for about 20% of all mammals.

Family: Pteropodidae (flying foxes, Old World fruit bats)
Subfamily: Pteropodinae
Genus: Eidolon
 Straw-coloured fruit bat, Eidolon helvum LC
Genus: Rousettus
 Egyptian fruit bat, Rousettus aegyptiacus LC
Family: Vespertilionidae
Subfamily: Myotinae
Genus: Cistugo
 Lesueur's hairy bat, Cistugo lesueuri VU
Subfamily: Vespertilioninae
Genus: Eptesicus
 Long-tailed house bat, Eptesicus hottentotus LC
Genus: Laephotis
 De Winton's long-eared bat, Laephotis wintoni LC
Genus: Neoromicia
 Cape serotine, Neoromicia capensis LC
Genus: Scotophilus
 African yellow bat, Scotophilus dinganii LC
Subfamily: Miniopterinae
Genus: Miniopterus
 Natal long-fingered bat, Miniopterus natalensis NT
Family: Nycteridae
Genus: Nycteris
 Egyptian slit-faced bat, Nycteris thebaica LC
Family: Rhinolophidae
Subfamily: Rhinolophinae
Genus: Rhinolophus
 Geoffroy's horseshoe bat, Rhinolophus clivosus LC
 Darling's horseshoe bat, Rhinolophus darlingi LC

Order: Carnivora (carnivorans) 

There are over 260 species of carnivorans, the majority of which feed primarily on meat. They have a characteristic skull shape and dentition. 
Suborder: Feliformia
Family: Felidae (cats)
Subfamily: Felinae
Genus: Acinonyx
Cheetah, Acinonyx jubatus VU
 South African cheetah, A. j. jubatus
Genus: Caracal
 Caracal, Caracal caracal LC
Genus: Felis
African wildcat, F. lybica 
Genus: Leptailurus
 Serval, Leptailurus serval LC
Subfamily: Pantherinae
Genus: Panthera
Leopard, P. pardus VU possibly extirpated
African leopard, P. p. pardus
Family: Viverridae (civets)
Subfamily: Viverrinae
Genus: Genetta
 Cape genet, Genetta tigrina LR/lc
Family: Herpestidae (mongooses)
Subfamily: Herpestinae
Genus: Herpestes
Cape gray mongoose, Herpestes pulverulentus LC
Family: Hyaenidae (hyaenas)
Genus: Parahyaena
 Brown hyena, Parahyaena brunnea LR/nt
Genus: Proteles
 Aardwolf, Proteles cristatus LR/lc
Suborder: Caniformia
Family: Canidae (dogs, foxes)
Genus: Lupulella
 Black-backed jackal, L. mesomelas  
Family: Mustelidae (mustelids)
Genus: Ictonyx
 Striped polecat, Ictonyx striatus LR/lc
Genus: Hydrictis
 Speckle-throated otter, H. maculicollis NT possibly extirpated
Genus: Aonyx
 African clawless otter, Aonyx capensis NT

Order: Perissodactyla (odd-toed ungulates) 

The odd-toed ungulates are browsing and grazing mammals. They are usually large to very large, and have relatively simple stomachs and a large middle toe.

Family: Equidae (horses etc.)
Genus: Equus
 Plains zebra, E. quagga NT extirpated
Burchell's zebra, E. q. burchellii extirpated

Order: Artiodactyla (even-toed ungulates) 

The even-toed ungulates are ungulates whose weight is borne about equally by the third and fourth toes, rather than mostly or entirely by the third as in perissodactyls. There are about 220 artiodactyl species, including many that are of great economic importance to humans.

Family: Bovidae (cattle, antelope, sheep, goats)
Subfamily: Alcelaphinae
Genus: Alcelaphus
 Hartebeest, Alcelaphus buselaphus LC extirpated
Genus: Connochaetes
 Black wildebeest, Connochaetes gnou LC
Genus: Damaliscus
 Bontebok, Damaliscus pygargus LR/cd
Subfamily: Antilopinae
Genus: Oreotragus
 Klipspringer, Oreotragus oreotragus LR/cd
Genus: Ourebia
 Oribi, Ourebia ourebi LR/cd
Subfamily: Bovinae
Genus: Syncerus
African buffalo, S. caffer NT extirpated
Genus: Tragelaphus
 Common eland, Tragelaphus oryx LR/cd
 Cape bushbuck, Tragelaphus scriptus LC possibly extirpated
Subfamily: Cephalophinae
Genus: Cephalophus
 Blue duiker, Cephalophus monticola LR/lc
Genus: Sylvicapra
 Common duiker, Sylvicapra grimmia LR/lc
Subfamily: Peleinae
Genus: Pelea
 Grey rhebok, Pelea capreolus LC
Subfamily: Reduncinae
Genus: Redunca
 Mountain reedbuck, Redunca fulvorufula LC

See also
List of chordate orders
Lists of mammals by region
List of prehistoric mammals
Mammal classification
List of mammals described in the 2000s

Notes

References
 

Lesotho
Lesotho
Mammals